Les Bons Vivants (High Lifers) is a French comedy film from 1965, directed by Gilles Grangier and Georges Lautner, that was written by Albert Simonin and Michel Audiard. It stars Bernard Blier, Mireille Darc, Andréa Parisy, Bernadette Lafont, and Louis de Funès.

Plot and Cast
The story is told in three separate chapters.

Chapter 1: The Closure
In Paris in 1946, when a new law closes all brothels, an owner has to dismiss his girls and dispose of the premises and their contents. He and his wife distribute parting gifts to the girls, including Héloïse. but one is away at a family bereavement. This is Lucette, for whom is reserved the red lantern that hung over the front door.

 Bernard Blier as Monsieur Charles, the owner of the brothel
 Dominique Davray as Madame Blanche, the madame
 Franck Villard as Monsieur Marcel, owner of another brothel 
 Mireille Darc as Héloïse, one of the girls

Chapter 2: The Trial
Two incompetent burglars break into the mansion of a baron and flee when disturbed, abandoning most of their loot. One is caught and put on trial, while the other got away with only a red lantern. In her testimony the baroness, formerly Lucette, charms the whole court as she says it was her most treasured possession.
 Andréa Parisy as the Baroness, formerly Lucette
 Jean Lefebvre as Léonard, burglar on trial
 Jean Carmet  as Paulo, burglar's accomplice
 Pierre Bertin as presiding judge
 Bernard Blier as Monsieur Charles
 Franck Villard as Monsieur Marcel

Chapter 3: Men of Good Taste
Walking home late one night from the private athletic club where the leading citizens of a little town keep fit., the bachelor Léon sees a plain-clothes policeman harassing Héloïse, a homeless young woman. Rescuing her, Léon offers her his dead mother's bedroom, upon which his housekeeper leaves in disgust. He is due to host the annual dinner of the club, so Héloïse recruits Sophie, a fellow worker, to cook and serve. The club members are so delighted by the food and the attentive waitresses that they resolve to hold dinners there more often. Héloïse recruits more girls to cope with the increased demand for their services. At Christmas, Leon gives Héloïse a special present he has found - a red lantern to hang over the front door.

 Louis de Funès as Léon
 Mireille Darc as Héloïse
 Jean Richard as Paul, club member
 Bernadette Lafont as Sophie

References

External links 
 
 Les Bons Vivants at the Films de France

1965 films
French comedy films
1960s French-language films
French anthology films
French black-and-white films
Films directed by Georges Lautner
Films directed by Gilles Grangier
Films produced by Robert Dorfmann
Films with screenplays by Michel Audiard
Films with screenplays by Albert Simonin
1960s French films